Tom or Thomas Crean may refer to:
Thomas Crean (1873–1923), Irish rugby union player, British Army soldier and doctor
Tom Crean (explorer) (1877–1938), Irish seaman and Antarctic explorer
Tom Crean (basketball) (born 1966), American head college men's basketball coach